Frances Gardiner Davenport (1870 – November 11, 1927) was an American historian who specialized in the later Middle Ages and the European colonization of the New World.

Early life
Born in 1870, Davenport was educated at Barnard College and Radcliffe, after which she pursued advanced studies in England before in 1904 graduating Ph.D. from the University of Chicago.

Career
Davenport's first published work was a classified list of printed sources for English 
manorial and agrarian history during the Middle Ages, produced under the supervision of William Ashley of Harvard. Her later work on English history included The Economic Development of a Norfolk Manor 1086–1565, published by the Cambridge University Press in 1906. Over many years she edited her magnum opus, the work finally published by the Carnegie Institution as European Treaties Bearing on the History of the United States and its Dependencies to 1648 (1917), and as a second volume covering the years 1650 to 1697 (1929), and was still working on further volumes when she died on November 11, 1927. These were completed by Charles O. Paullin.

Selected publications
Frances Gardiner Davenport, A Classified List of Printed Original Materials for English Manorial and Agrarian History During the Middle Ages (Burt Franklin Bibliography and Reference Series, No.53, 1894)
Frances Gardiner Davenport, The Economic Development of a Norfolk Manor, 1086–1565 (Cambridge: Cambridge University Press, 1906)
Frances Gardiner Davenport, ed., European Treaties Bearing on the History of the United States and its Dependencies to 1648 (1917)
Autobiography of Frances Gardiner Davenport, 1890–1920 (undated, c. 1928, booklet of 19 pages)
Frances Gardiner Davenport, ed., European Treaties Bearing on the History of the United States and its Dependencies 1650–1697 (1929)
Frances Gardiner Davenport & Charles O. Paullin, eds., European Treaties Bearing on the History of the United States and its Dependencies: Volume III 
Frances Gardiner Davenport & Charles O. Paullin, eds., European Treaties Bearing on the History of the United States and Its Dependencies: Volume IV 1716–1815

Notes

External links
 
European Treaties Bearing on the History of the United States and its Dependencies 1650—1697, full text online at archive.org
The Economic Development of a Norfolk Manor 1086-1565 (1906) by Frances Gardiner Davenport 

1870 births
1927 deaths
Barnard College alumni
Radcliffe College alumni
American historians
University of Chicago alumni